Michel Charles Durieu de Maisonneuve (7 December 1796 – 20 February 1878) was a French soldier and botanist who was a native of Saint-Eutrope-de-Born in the department of Lot-et-Garonne.

He studied at École Militaire de Brienne, and later at the military school of Saint-Cyr, where he received the rank of sub-lieutenant. He entered military service in 1813, and would be associated with the French army until 1848. He participated in the Battle of Trocadero at Cadiz, and was involved in the 1843 Battle of Smala against the forces of Abd-El-Kader (1808–1883). 

In the mid-1820s Durieu de Maisonneuve developed an interest in natural history and botany by studying fresh water algae. He participated in the Morea expedition to Greece with naturalist Jean Baptiste Bory de Saint-Vincent (1778–1846), and in 1840-44 was a member of a committee for scientific exploration of Algeria. During his years in the military he also performed botanical investigations in France, Spain (Asturias) and northern Portugal.

Durieu de Maisonneuve studied cryptogam species with Bory de Saint-Vincent, Camille Montagne (1784–1866), Joseph-Henri Léveillé (1796–1870), and the brothers Charles (1817–1884) and Louis René Tulasne (1815–1885). He was particularly interested in quillworts, of which, he described several new species. He also performed research of spermatophytes with Ernest Cosson (1819–1889), who was an authority of North African flora. 

The botanical genus Durieua was named after him by Pierre Edmond Boissier and Georges François Reuter.

Selected works 
 Exploration Scientifique de l'Algerie, 2 volumes; (plus atlas), 1846-1855.
 Bory de St Vincent, J.B.G.M.; Durieu de Maisonneuve, M.C. 1849. Atlas de la Flore d‘Algérie ou Illustrations d‘un Grand Nombre de Plantes Nouvelles ou Rares de ce Pays. Botanique. 39 pp., 90 illustrations. París; Impr. Nationale
 Plantae Selectae Hispano-Lusitanicae, Section I. 1856.

References 
Laboratoire de Botanique et de Mycologie (biography in French)

19th-century French botanists
People from Lot-et-Garonne
1796 births
1878 deaths
Bryologists
Taxon authorities of Hypericum species